There have been five baronetcies created for persons with the surname Barker, three in the Baronetage of England, one in the Baronetage of Great Britain and one in the Baronetage of the United Kingdom. All five creations are extinct.

The Barker Baronetcy, of Grimston Hall in the County of Suffolk, was created in the Baronetage of England on 17 March 1622 for John Barker. The fourth Baronet sat as Member of Parliament for Ipswich. The fifth Baronet represented Ipswich, Thetford and Suffolk in Parliament. The title became extinct on the death of the seventh Baronet in 1766.

The Barker Baronetcy, of Hambleton in the County of Rutland, was created in the Baronetage of England on 9 September 1665 for Abel Barker, Member of Parliament for Rutland. The title became extinct on the death of the second Baronet in 1707.

The Barker Baronetcy, of Bocking Hall in the County of Essex, was created in the Baronetage of England on 29 March 1676 for William Barker. The title became extinct on the death of the fourth Baronet in 1818. Through marriage into the Alexander family, they acquired the impressive stately home Kilcooly Abbey, County Tipperary, Ireland  which became their principal residence.

The Barker Baronetcy, of Bushbridge in the County of Surrey, was created in the Baronetage of Great Britain on 24 March 1781 for Robert Barker, previously Member of Parliament for Wallingford. The title became extinct on his death in 1789.

The Barker Baronetcy, of Bishop's Stortford in the County of Hertford, was created in the Baronetage of the United Kingdom on 1 December 1908 for the entrepreneur and politician John Barker. The title became extinct upon his death in 1914.

Barker baronets, of Grimston Hall (1622)

Sir John Barker, 1st Baronet (died 1652)
Sir John Barker, 2nd Baronet (died 1664)
Sir Jeremy Barker, 3rd Baronet (died 1665)
Sir John Barker, 4th Baronet (1655–1696)
Sir William Barker, 5th Baronet (1685–1731)
Sir John Barker, 6th Baronet (1724– 1757) of Sproughton
Sir John Fytche Barker, 7th Baronet (1741–1766)

Barker baronets, of Hambleton (1665)

Sir Abel Barker, 1st Baronet (–1679)  
Sir Thomas Barker, 2nd Baronet (c. 1648–1707)

Barker baronets, of Bocking Hall (1676)

Sir William Barker, 1st Baronet (c. 1652–c. 1719)  
Sir William Barker, 2nd Baronet (c. 1677–1746)  
Sir William Barker, 3rd Baronet (1704–1770) 
Sir William Barker, 4th Baronet (died 1818)

Barker baronets, of Bushbridge (1781)

Sir Robert Barker, 1st Baronet (died 1789)

Barker baronets, of Bishop's Stortford (1908)
Sir John Barker, 1st Baronet (1840–1914)

See also
Barker-Mill baronets

References

Extinct baronetcies in the Baronetage of England
Extinct baronetcies in the Baronetage of Great Britain
Extinct baronetcies in the Baronetage of the United Kingdom
1622 establishments in England